Cryptolechia bifida is a moth in the family Depressariidae. It was described by Wang in 2006. It is found in China (Guangxi).

The length of the forewings is 12–13 mm. The forewings are dark brown, the costal margin with an inverted-triangular cream spot at about the distal one-fifth and a cream fascia extending from the costal two-fifths to the tornus. The hindwings are grey.

Etymology
The specific name refers to the shape of the uncus and is derived from Latin bifidus (meaning split in two).

References

Moths described in 2006
Cryptolechia (moth)